Sanje ya Kati (Swahili Kisiwa cha kale cha Sanje ya Kati) is protected, uninhabited historic site located on Sanje ya Kati Island in Pande Mikoma ward in Kilwa District in Lindi Region of Tanzania's Indian Ocean coast. The site is home to medieval Swahili ruins that have yet to be fully excavated.

See also
Historic Swahili Settlements
National Historic Sites in Tanzania
Swahili architecture

References

Swahili people
Swahili city-states
Swahili culture
Uninhabited islands of Tanzania
National Historic Sites in Tanga Region
National Historic Sites in Tanzania
Archaeological sites in Tanzania